Kwai Hing is one of the 31 constituencies of the Kwai Tsing District, returning one member to the Kwai Tsing District Council every four years. It was first created in 1994.

Loosely based on Kwai Hing Estate, the constituency has an estimated population of 13,197 as of 2019.

Councillors represented

Election results

2010s

2000s

1990s

References

2011 District Council Election Results (Kwai Tsing)
2007 District Council Election Results (Kwai Tsing)
2003 District Council Election Results (Kwai Tsing)

Constituencies of Hong Kong
Constituencies of Kwai Tsing District Council
1994 establishments in Hong Kong
Constituencies established in 1994
Kwai Chung